"A Hit Is a Hit" is the 10th episode of the HBO original series The Sopranos. Written by Joe Bosso and Frank Renzulli, and directed by Matthew Penn, it originally aired on March 14, 1999.

Starring
 James Gandolfini as Tony Soprano
 Lorraine Bracco as Dr. Jennifer Melfi
 Edie Falco as Carmela Soprano
 Michael Imperioli as Christopher Moltisanti
 Dominic Chianese as Corrado Soprano, Jr. *
 Vincent Pastore as Pussy Bonpensiero
 Steven Van Zandt as Silvio Dante
 Tony Sirico as Paulie Gualtieri
 Robert Iler as Anthony Soprano, Jr. *
 Jamie-Lynn Sigler as Meadow Soprano
 Nancy Marchand as Livia Soprano *

* = credit only

Guest starring
 Jerry Adler as Hesh Rabkin
 Drea de Matteo as Adriana
 Bokeem Woodbine as Massive Genius

Also guest starring

Synopsis
Paulie, Chris, and Pussy rob and kill a Colombian drug dealer. They get a huge amount of cash — as Tony says, a once-in-a-lifetime score.

Chris and Adriana get to know Massive Genius, a rich gangster rapper, and Chris arranges a sit-down for him with Hesh Rabkin. Massive says he is acting on behalf of the mother of a deceased black singer whose royalties Hesh stole, and now claims $400,000. Hesh refuses, and later threatens a counterclaim: there is an unauthorized sampling by Massive's record label of a song that Hesh's label still controls. Massive says he will see Hesh in court. When the conversation is over, Tony and his crew jeer at this modern-day gangster who goes through the law.

Adriana proposes that she should pursue a career as a music producer and that Massive can help. Chris, flush with money, agrees to finance a demo for the band Visiting Day, whose singer, Richie Santini, is Adriana's ex-boyfriend. The demo recording progresses slowly and badly and eventually, Chris smashes Richie's guitar over his back. Chris is told by Hesh that the band is not good, and realizes that Massive is helping them only because of his interest in Adriana. When he tells her this, she accuses him of trying to hold her back and storms out.

Carmela wonders whether she and the children will be all right if anything happens to Tony, but he reassures her. A friend introduces her to the stock market and gives her a tip; she buys and profits.

Tony would like to mix with meddigans, White Americans not of Italian descent. After some hesitation, he accepts an invitation from Dr. Cusamano (his physician) to play a round of golf at his country club along with friends of his. Cusamano's friends pester and embarrass Tony with questions about organized crime. As he tells Dr. Melfi, he felt he was being "used for somebody else's amusement, like a dancing bear."

First appearances
Jean Cusamano: Wife of Dr. Cusamano and friend of the Soprano family

Deceased
Gallegos a.k.a. "Juan Valdez": Shot in the forehead by Paulie Gualtieri

Title reference
 The title refers to when Hesh Rabkin mentions to Christopher that he knows a hit song when he hears one, saying "a hit is a hit" and that the band Visiting Day's song is not a hit, and they are not particularly talented.
 Giving the title a double meaning, a hit is also the slang term for a mafia-ordered murder; the episode opens with a hit on a Colombian drug dealer, and while hosting Tony in a golf game at his country club, Bruce Cusamano refers to mobster Carmine Galante's assassination as a "fuckin' beautiful hit".

Other cultural references
 One of Massive's entourage refers to Chris as Donnie Brasco.
 Massive references The Godfather, The Godfather Part II, as well as The Godfather Part III, the latter of which he labels as "misunderstood."
 While golfing with Bruce Cusamano and his friends, they ask him if he had ever met John Gotti; Tony tells a made-up story about Gotti's fondness for a certain kind of ice cream truck, which enthralls them. They also mention Umberto's Clam House in New York City, and ask Tony if he has ever been to Mount Plymouth, Florida where Al Capone used to go to play golf. Bruce later tells Tony that the golf club's membership books are closed, seemingly drawing a parallel to the memberships in becoming a made man.
 At a dinner party, Bruce Cusamano refers to the scene where Joe Pesci's character puts someone's head in a vise in Casino.
 An envious Christopher complains to Adriana that Massive Genius lives in The Hamptons where he is visited by Alec Baldwin and Whitney Houston.
 Christopher names what he considers to be "great Italian singers: "Frankie Valli, Dion, and The Rascals. Adriana then turns up the Bon Jovi song "You Give Love a Bad Name" as "paisan pride."
 When Adriana asks what "experts" Christopher discussed the Visiting Day demo with, he names Hesh and also Silvio, who he says used to own "rock clubs in Asbury". Steven Van Zandt is a Springsteen side-man and a key figure in the Asbury music scene.
 Hesh refers to Jimi Hendrix and the Cafe Wha? when referring to musical talent.

Music
 The song played when Tony, Christopher, and Paulie celebrate their big score at a hotel with their Cumares is "A Dreamer's Holiday" by Ray Anthony. 
 The song played when Christopher and Adriana come to a party at Massive Genius' mansion is "DJ Keep Playin' (Get Your Music On)" by Yvette Michele.
 Earlier in the episode, while Christopher and Adriana talk about their tastes in music, she plays "You Give Love a Bad Name" by Bon Jovi.
 When Christopher and Adriana hatch their music management plan over dinner, the background song is "Decara a la pared" from Lhasa De Sela's album "La Llorona".
 The song played when Christopher and Adriana take Massive Genius to a club to watch Visiting Day perform. Also later, when Visiting Day try to cut their record; and later still, when Adriana plays the song for Massive Genius, and Christopher plays the song for Hesh is "Erase Myself" by the fictional band Visiting Day. 
 The song played when Hesh looks over his mementos from his days running a record label is "Fools Follow Angels" by Little Jimmy Willis. 
 The background song when Adriana is modeling her black dress for Christopher near the end of the episode is "Why" by Annie Lennox.
 The song played in one of the closing scenes, which Hesh hears and then says to Christopher, "Now that is a hit", is "Nobody Loves Me But You" by Dori Hartley.
 The songs performed by the episode's fictional band, Visiting Day/Defiler, were created and performed bespoke by Bear Iyer and Nick Fowler. "Defile You" is played over the end credits.

Filming locations 
Listed in order of first appearance:

 North Caldwell, New Jersey
 Soundview, Bronx
 Livingston, New Jersey
 Jersey City, New Jersey
 Glen Head, New York

References

External links
"A Hit Is a Hit"  at HBO

The Sopranos (season 1) episodes
1999 American television episodes